Arcadia University is a census-designated place located in Cheltenham Township, Montgomery County, Pennsylvania.  It is located just off campus at Arcadia University and off Pennsylvania Route 309.  As of the 2010 census the population was 595 residents.

With 10,438 people per square mile, Arcadia University is the most densely populated census-designated place in Montgomery County and 33rd most densely populated census-designated place in the U.S. It is one of only two places in Montgomery County that has over 10,000 people per square mile (the other is Conshohocken). This is attributed to the land area consisting mostly of college dormitories.

Arcadia University is home to National Historic Landmark Grey Towers Castle which serves as the main administration building for Arcadia University.

Demographics

References

Census-designated places in Montgomery County, Pennsylvania
Census-designated places in Pennsylvania
Cheltenham Township, Pennsylvania